Gabriele (or Gabriella) Baumberg  (or Bamberg) (24 March 1766 – 24 July 1839), wife of János Batsányi (also Bacsányi), was an Austrian author and poet.

Life 

Baumberg was born in Vienna, the daughter of an Austrian civil servant. She received a humanistic education and from early on was fascinated by literature. As a result of her interest she later frequented the literary circles of Vienna.

She married the Hungarian author János Batsányi in 1805. Her husband translated Napoleon's proclamation into Hungarian after which, as a traitor, he was obliged to flee to Paris, taking his wife with him.

After the end of the Napoleonic Wars Batsányi was handed over to the Austrian authorities, who at first imprisoned him in Vienna and then exiled him to Linz. Gabriele accompanied him to both places, and died in Linz in 1839.

She wrote short poems and prose pieces throughout her life. Several of Baumberg's poems were set to music by W. A. Mozart, Franz Xaver Mozart, and Schubert. In 1793, she set the theme of the first movement of Haydn's String Quartet, Op. 50, No. 1 to words, for inscription on a monument honouring Haydn in the composer's home town of Rohrau, Austria.

Selected works 
 Sämmtliche Gedichte (1800) [Complete Poems], online 
 Amor und Hymen (1807) (volume of poetry)

Notes

References

Sources

Further reading 
 Wolfram Seidler: Gabriele Baumberg (1766–1839), ihr Nachlass in der Bibliothek der Ungarischen Akademie der Wissenschaften. In: István Németh, András Vizkelety (ed.): Ex libris et manuscriptis. Quellen, Editionen, Untersuchungen zur österreichischen und ungarischen Geistesgeschichte. Akad. Kiadó, Budapest 1994, pp. 79–90 (Schriftenreihe des Komitees Österreich-Ungarn 3).

External links 
 
 
 
 Some of her poems, zgedichte.de 
 Sämmtliche Gedichte Gabrielens von Baumberg (1800)

1766 births
1839 deaths
Writers from Vienna
Austrian women poets